Rada "Rada" Savić (born 18 June 1961 in Belgrad) is a former Yugoslav handball player who competed in the 1980 Summer Olympics.

In 1980 she won the silver medal with the Yugoslav team. She played two matches.

External links
profile

1961 births
Living people
Serbian female handball players
Yugoslav female handball players
Handball players at the 1980 Summer Olympics
Olympic handball players of Yugoslavia
Olympic silver medalists for Yugoslavia
Olympic medalists in handball
Medalists at the 1980 Summer Olympics